In Norse mythology, Viðfinnr ("wood-Finn") is the father of Hjúki and Bil, a brother and sister who, according to Gylfaginning, were taken up from the earth by Máni, the personified moon, as they were fetching water from the well Byrgir.

Notes

References
 Lindow, John (2001). Norse Mythology: A Guide to the Gods, Heroes, Rituals, and Beliefs. Oxford University Press. .

Characters in Norse mythology